The Zagreb Indoors (currently sponsored by PBZ) was a men's tennis event on the ATP Tour held in the Croatian capital of Zagreb. In 1996 and 1997 the tournament was named Croatian Indoors. From 2009 until 2015, it was a part of the ATP 250 Series and offered 250 ranking points. The tournament was played on a fast and hard indoor surface (RuKort) and featured both  men's singles and  men's doubles tournament.

The Zagreb Indoors was held for the first time in nine years in 2006. The tournament was an ATP International Series tournament from 2006 to 2008. Previously it had been an ATP World Series event from 1996 to 1997.

In 1998 tournament was moved to Split and was held for only one season under the name Croatian Indoors.

Past finals

Singles

Doubles

See also
List of tennis tournaments

References

External links
Official website
ATP tournament profile

 
Tennis tournaments in Croatia
Indoor tennis tournaments
Hard court tennis tournaments
Carpet court tennis tournaments
Sport in Zagreb
Recurring sporting events established in 1996
Recurring sporting events disestablished in 2015
1996 establishments in Croatia